Miles Maryott (1873 - September 20, 1939) was an American baseball player, painter, and convicted murderer. His paintings can be seen at the Museum of Nebraska Art in Kearney, Nebraska.

References

1873 births
1939 deaths
People from Tekamah, Nebraska
Baseball players from Nebraska
Painters from Nebraska
American people convicted of murder